Shakhmatny Bulletin (Chess Bulletin) was a Russian chess magazine.  It was published monthly from 1955 to 1990 and published about 2,500 complete games per year.  Yuri Averbakh was an editor.  The circulation was 20,000.  Bobby Fischer called Shakhmatny Bulletin "the best chess magazine in the world."

Notes

1955 establishments in the Soviet Union
1990 disestablishments in the Soviet Union
Chess periodicals
Chess in the Soviet Union
Magazines established in 1955
Magazines disestablished in 1990
Russian-language magazines
Sports magazines published in Russia
Magazines published in the Soviet Union